Ghost in the Ruins – A Tribute to Criss Oliva is a live album by the American heavy metal band Savatage, recorded between 1987 and 1990. Many of the tracks on this album have since been added to the re-releases of other albums in the Savatage discography by the German label SPV in 2002. The Japanese version of the album, titled  Final Bell – Tribute to Christopher Michael Oliva and released by Zero Corporation in 1997, shows the track "Criss Intro" as "Criss Oliva Guitar Solo" on the track listing.

Track listing

Personnel
Savatage
Jon Oliva – lead vocals, piano, co-producer
Criss Oliva – lead guitar, acoustic guitar
Chris Caffery – rhythm guitar
Johnny Lee Middleton – bass guitar
Steve "Doc" Wacholz – drums and percussion

Production
Paul O'Neill – producer
Robert Kinkel – engineer
Ken Lewis, Joe Johnson, Mike Scielzi, Joe Daily – additional engineering
Steve Corson – assistant engineer
Dave Whittman – mixing at Soundtrack Studios, New York
Ben Arrindell – mixing assistant
Leon Zervos – mastering

References

Savatage albums
1995 live albums
Nuclear Blast live albums
SPV/Steamhammer live albums
Albums produced by Paul O'Neill (rock producer)